The 2022 European Open Pool Championship was a nine-ball pool tournament held from 9 to 14 August 2022 in Hotel Esperanto Fulda, Fulda, Germany. It was  the inaugural event.

Tournament format
There will be four loser rounds, with the first three being a race to 8 and the loser qualification being a race to 9. At that point it will become a single-elimination tournament, as a race to 11 racks. The final will be a race to 13 racks.

Prize fund
The total prize fund is $200,000 with the winner receiving $30,000.

References

External links
 

European Open Pool Championship
European Open
European Open